The Archdeacon of Cleveland is a senior ecclesiastical officer of an archdeaconry, or subdivision, of the Church of England diocese and province of York. The Archdeaconry of Cleveland stretches west from Thirsk, north to Middlesbrough, east to Whitby and south to Pickering. It has a varied geography, including the southern parts of the conurbation of Teesside and the open moors of the North York Moors National Park.

History
Archdeacons occurred in the Diocese of York before 1093; before 1128, there were five serving simultaneously – probably each in their own area, but none occurs with a territorial title before 1133. The title Archdeacon of Cleveland is first recorded before 1174 with Ralph, Archdeacon of Cleveland. Of the five archdeaconries, Cleveland is one of three which has never split from York diocese.

People
The archdeaconry is led by the area Bishop of Whitby, Paul Ferguson and by the Archdeacon of Cleveland, Amanda Bloor since 15 June 2020.

Organisation
In common with other archdeaconries, Cleveland is further subdivided into deaneries:
Guisborough
Middlesbrough
Mowbray
Northern Ryedale
Stokesley
Whitby

List of archdeacons
Some archdeacons without territorial titles are recorded from around the time of Thomas of Bayeux; see Archdeacon of York.

High Medieval
bef. 1128–aft. 1137: Hugh the Chanter
bef. 1139–aft. 1154: Ralph de Baro
bef. 1159–bef. 1171 (res.): John son of Letold (afterwards Archdeacon of Nottingham)
bef. 1173–aft. 1174: Ralph (disputed; possibly vice-archdeacon)
bef. 1171–1189 (d.): Jeremy
July 1189– (res.): Geoffrey de Muschamp
bef. 1200–bef. 1200 (res.): John de Gray (Archdeacon of Gloucester at same or similar time)
March 1201–aft. 1209: Ralph de Kyme (archbishop's appointment)
March–September 1201: Hugh Murdac (unsuccessful canons' appointment)
aft. 1213–bef. 1223: William of Ely
bef. 1225–aft. 1229: Matthew Scot
bef. 1230–aft. 1238: Serlo (possibly the same-named Dean of Exeter)
bef. 1233–aft. 1233: Walter de Taney, Archdeacon of the East Riding (acting)
bef. 1246–bef. 1262: John de Langeton the elder
Roger (disputed)
bef. 1264–aft. 1278: Rufinus of Tonengo
2 May 1281–aft. 1286: Thomas de Grimston
17 July 1289 – 12 August 1317 (d.): Stephen de Mauley

Late Medieval
4 February 1318–bef. 1334 (res.): Adrian de Fieschi
28 October 1334 – 20 September 1348 (exch.): Innocent de Fieschi
August 1343 & August 1344: William de Weston (ineffective royal grants)
20 September 1348–bef. 1351 (d.): John Ellerker
26 September 1351 – 5 March 1355 (exch.): Thomas de Holwell
5 March 1355 – 21 September 1379 (d.): William de Ferriby
23 September 1379–bef. 1379: William de Catton
7–9 November 1379 (exch.): William Kexby
9 November 1379–bef. 1380: Roger de Ripon
1380–14 January 1381 (exch.): Robert de Manfeld
14 January 1381 – 2 April 1385 (exch.): Adam Spencer
2 April 1385–bef. 1387 (d.): John Marshall
6 March–bef. 11 June 1387 (d.): John Fitzthomas
11 June 1387–bef. 1391: Alexander Herle
bef. 1391–August 1410 (d.): Thomas Walkington
31 August 1410 – 28 May 1411 (res.): Clement Stanton
9 March 1411–bef. 1414 (res.): Richard Pittes (royal grant)
10 June 1414 – 1434 (d.): William Pelleson
September 1434 – 1453 (d.): William Duffield
18 August 1453–bef. 1457 (d.): Stephen Wilton
12 August 1457 – 1470 (res.): William Brande
September 1470 – 1485 (res.): William Poteman
13 January 1485 – 1485 (d.): William Constable
11 October 1485 – 1493 (res.): Henry Carnebull
30 April 1493 – 1497 (res.): Geoffrey Blythe
March–May 1497 (res.): John Hole
May 1497 – 1499 (res.): Thomas Crossley

18 August 1499–bef. 1506 (d.): John Reynald
13 June 1507 – 1523 (res.): Richard Rawlins
December 1523–bef. 1533 (d.): James Denton
June 1533 – 1533 (exch.): Thomas Bedyll
August 1533 – 1534 (res.): William Clyff
7 October 1534–bef. 1547 (d.): Richard Langridge

Early modern
9 July 1547–bef. 1564 (res.): John Warner (also Dean of Winchester from 1559)
31 March 1564 – 24 March 1570 (d.): Christopher Malton
11 April 1570 – 8 May 1582 (d.): Ralph Coulton
8 June 1582 – 1589 (res.): Richard Remington (afterwards Archdeacon of the East Riding)
10 March 1589 – 19 April 1601 (res.): Richard Byrde
20 April 1601 – 1619 (res.): John Phillips (also Bishop of Sodor and Man from 1605)
August 1619–30 September 1635 (res.): Henry Thurscross
1 October 1635 – 15 October 1638 (res.): Timothy Thurscross
24 October 1638 – 1675 (d.): John Neale
27 April 1675 – 9 September 1680 (d.): Robert Feild
9 October 1680 – 1682 (res.): John Lake
5 January 1683 – 1685 (d.): Barnabas Long
23 July 1685 – 24 November 1700 (d.): John Burton
7 December 1700 – 12 June 1711 (d.): James Fall
3 August 1711 – 28 October 1735 (d.): John Richardson
17 November 1735 – 1750 (res.): Jaques Sterne (afterwards Archdeacon of the East Riding)
18 July 1750 – 7 August 1787 (d.): Francis Blackburne
22 August 1787 – 4 November 1805 (d.): Robert Peirson
15 January 1806 – 19 June 1820 (d.): Charles Baillie-Hamilton
28 June 1820 – 1828 (res.): Francis Wrangham
3 December 1828 – 27 October 1832 (res.): Leveson Venables-Vernon-Harcourt 
2 November 1832 – 24 December 1845 (d.): Henry Todd
17 January 1846 – 17 January 1874 (res.): Edward Churton

Late modern
bef. 1875–1882 (d.): William Hey
188330 March 1897 (d.): Henry Yeoman
1897–1906 (res.): William Hutchings
1907–1938 (ret.): Thomas Lindsay (afterward archdeacon emeritus)
1938–1942 (d.): Basil Carter
1942–1946: Edmund Hope
1947–1947 (res.): George Townley
1947–1965 (ret.): William Palin (afterward archdeacon emeritus)
1965–1974 (ret.): Stanley Linsley (afterward archdeacon emeritus)
1974–1984 (res.): John Southgate
1985–1991 (ret.): Ron Woodley (afterward archdeacon emeritus)
1991–2001 (ret.): Chris Hawthorn (afterward archdeacon emeritus)
20013 July 2014: Paul Ferguson
12 June 20142015 (Acting): Richard Rowling
6 May 20159 October 2019: Sam Rushton (became Archdeacon of York)
9 October 201915 June 2020: Clay Roundtree, Acting Archdeacon
15 June 2020present: Amanda Bloor

Notes

References

Sources

Diocese of York
Christianity in North Yorkshire